The Battle of Lérida (1938) took place during the Spanish Civil War in 1938.

References 
https://carolineangus.com/2018/04/16/this-week-in-spanish-civil-war-history-weeks-90-94-1-30-april-1938/

Lérida 
Lérida
1938 in Spain
Lérida